Nożyno  is a village in the administrative district of Gmina Czarna Dąbrówka, within Bytów County, Pomeranian Voivodeship, in northern Poland.

The village has a population of 312.

Notable residents
 Karl Wilhelm Krüger (1796–1874), Hellenist

References

Villages in Bytów County